Fagus engleriana, the Engler's beech, also known as Chinese beech, is a species of beech native to central and eastern China (Anhui, Guangxi, Guizhou, Henan, Hubei, Hunan, Shaanxi, Sichuan, Yunnan, and Zhejiang provinces) where it grows in broad-leaved and mixed forests. It can reach  in height.

The shoots are dark brown and hairless. Leaves contain 10-14 vein-pairs and the margin is hairless, deckled and scarcely toothed.

References

External links
Fagus engleriana at NC State University

engleriana
Trees of China
Trees of Korea